The Minister of Foreign Affairs is an appointment in the Cabinet of Sri Lanka who is responsible for overseeing the international diplomacy of the Government of Sri Lanka. The post was first created in 1947 as Minister of External Affairs and Defence, in 1978 the Ministry of External Affairs and Defence separated into two ministries, the Ministry of Foreign Affairs and the Ministry of Defence. Prior to the separation of the post the Minister of External Affairs and Defence was held by the Prime Minister since 1947, with a Parliamentary Secretary for Defence and External Affairs who was an elected parliamentarian and was the de facto foreign minister.

List of Foreign Ministers
Parties
 (13)
 (9)
 (2)
 (1)

See also
 Ministry of Foreign Affairs
 Ministry of External Affairs and Defence

References

External links
 Ministry of Foreign Affairs
 Sri Lanka 54th Independence Anniversary, Colonial rule to independence, by Aryadasa Ratnasinghe
  Sri Lankan Foreign Ministers

 
Foreign Affairs